The 2003 Central American and Caribbean Cross Country Championships took place on March 16, 2003.  The races were held at the Club de Golf Acapulco in Acapulco, México.

Complete results, and results for junior and youth competitions, were published.

Medallists

Race results

Senior men's race (12 km)

Note: Athletes in parentheses did not score for the team result.

Junior (U20) men's race (8 km)

Note: Athletes in parentheses did not score for the team result.

Senior women's race (8 km)

Note: Athletes in parentheses did not score for the team result.

Junior (U20) women's race (6 km)

Note: Athletes in parentheses did not score for the team result.

Medal table (unofficial)

Note: Totals include both individual and team medals, with medals in the team competition counting as one medal.

Participation
According to an unofficial count, 79 athletes from 8 countries participated.

 (6)
 (3)
 (4)
 (20)
 México (15)
 (19)
 (4)
 (8)

See also
 2003 in athletics (track and field)

References

Cross country running competitions
Central American and Caribbean Cross Country Championships
International athletics competitions hosted by Mexico
Central American and Caribbean Cross Country Championships
Cross country running in Mexico